The Torre della Zecca (Mint Tower) is a tower in the city walls of Florence, closing the city off from the river Arno to the east and thus known as a "torre terminale". It is now isolated in the middle of a junction on the viali di Circonvallazione in piazza Piave, near the lungarno della Zecca Vecchia.

Zecca